Santa Trinita (Italian for "Holy Trinity") is a Roman Catholic church located in front of the piazza of the same name, traversed by Via de' Tornabuoni, in central Florence, region of Tuscany, Italy.  It is the mother church of the Vallumbrosan Order of monks, founded in 1092 by a Florentine nobleman. South on Via de' Tornabuoni is the Ponte Santa Trinita over the river Arno; across the street is the Palazzo Spini Feroni.

History
The church is home to the Sassetti Chapel, containing 15th-century frescoes by Domenico Ghirlandaio, and the Bartolini Salimbeni Chapel, with frescoes by Lorenzo Monaco.

Even though the modern Italian word for "trinity" is trinità, with an accent indicating stress on the last vowel, the old Florentine pronunciation used to put the stress on the first vowel, and the name is therefore written without an accent; sometimes, it is accented as trìnita to indicate the unusual pronunciation.

The current church was constructed in 1258–1280 at the site of a pre-existing 11th-century church. Multiple reconstructions occurred over the centuries. The Mannerist façade (1593–1594) was designed by Bernardo Buontalenti. The bas-relief over the central door of the Trinity was sculpted by Pietro Bernini and Giovanni Battista Caccini. The 17th-century wooden doors have carved panels depicting Saints of the Vallumbrosan order. The Column of Justice (Colonna di Giustizia) in the piazza outside, originates from the Baths of Caracalla in Rome, and was a gift to Cosimo I de' Medici by Pope Pius IV. It was erected in 1565 to commemorate the Battle of Montemurlo in which Florence defeated Siena.

The Santa Trinita Maestà by Cimabue was once at the high altar of the church, and was later moved to a side chapel. It is now exhibited at the Uffizi.

Chapels
The church has approximately 20 chapels, many with masterworks. The most significant are the Sassetti and the Bartolini Salimbeni chapels. Francesco Sassetti had been a manager of the Medici Bank, and some of the Ghirlandaio frescoes capture views of contemporary Florence.

Notes

References

External links

Basilica churches in Florence
Gothic architecture in Florence
Mannerist architecture in Italy
16th-century Roman Catholic church buildings in Italy
Roman Catholic churches completed in 1594